Nickelodeon was a television channel in New Zealand that targeted audiences aged 3–14. The channel launched on 1 August 2006 and was available on Sky Television Channel 041. The channel closed on 30 November 2010, and New Zealand schedule is now managed by Nickelodeon Australia as their timeshift feed. The channel used to be headquartered in Auckland, New Zealand, shared with fellow Viacom channel MTV New Zealand.

History

Background
The Southeast Asian version of Nickelodeon (broadcast from Singapore) was made available to the viewers on Sky Digital and UHF in New Zealand in January 2000.

Operation
The channel broadcast for 24 hours a day. Nick Jr. was a block on the channel, broadcasting from 9:30am-2pm from Monday-Wednesday, 9:30am-2:30pm on Thursday and Friday and 6:30-8am on weekends.

Closure
According to the NZPA, MTV Networks New Zealand (which consists of Nickelodeon, MTV and Comedy Central) announced in September 2010 that it would close its New Zealand offices from 1 December 2010, with the networks' portfolio continuing to run from the  MTV Networks Australia's Sydney offices. This meant that Viacom's television channel operations in New Zealand were to be overseen from Australia, with both Nick Jr. and MTV Classic announced to launch in New Zealand.

On 1 December 2010, the Australian version of Nickelodeon replaced the New Zealand version.

Logo history

See also
 MTV New Zealand

References

 SKY TV Announcement
 Nickelodeon NZ Launch Party

New Zealand
Television channels and stations established in 2006
Children's television networks
Television channels and stations disestablished in 2010
Defunct television channels in New Zealand
English-language television stations in New Zealand
2006 establishments in New Zealand
2010 disestablishments in New Zealand